The Cupa României Final was the final match of the 2015–16 Cupa României, played between Dinamo București and CFR Cluj. CFR Cluj won the match, 5–4 after penalties.

Match

External links
 Official site 

2016
2015–16 in Romanian football
2016 Cupa Romaniei Final
CFR Cluj matches
Cupa Romaniei Final 2016